More  was a women's lifestyle magazine published 10 times a year by the Meredith Corporation with a rate base of 1.3 million and a circulation of 1.8 million. A Canadian version was published under license by Transcontinental from 2007 to 2012.

History and profile
The magazine was started in 1997 and the first issue appeared in September 1998.

More also produces the More Magazine/Fitness Magazine Women's Half-Marathon, a NYC event in partnership with the New York Road Runners, "Escape with More" at the Miraval Arizona Resort and Spa and the "Fierce and Fabulous Girls Night Out" event series. In 2010 More introduced the annual More Beauty Search Contest, which women over 30 can enter for the chance to win cash prizes and be featured in the magazine. In 2013, More launched "More Uncorked", a new wine club in partnership with Women of the Vine that delivers wines made by artisan women winemakers of California. 

In February 2010, More was updated with a new logo and tagline: "For Women of Style and Substance".

In February 2016, the Meredith Corporation announced that More would cease publication with the April 2016 issue.

Awards
 Included on Advertising Age’s "A List" of Top 10 magazines in 2003, 2005, 2006 and 2007
 Media magazine's "Best Women’s Lifestyle Magazine" of 2004
 Honored by Capell's Circulation Report as one of the Top 10 Newsstand Performers in 2006
 Advertising Age 2006 Magazine of the Year
 Spots on the Adweek "Hot List" in 2006, 2007 and 2010
 2012 National Magazine Award Finalist: General Excellence
 2010 National Magazine Award Finalist: General Excellence
 2009 National Magazine Award Finalist: Personal Service
 2007 Nominee for National Magazine Award for General Excellence 
 ASJA 2012 Honorable Mention in the Lifestyle Narratives category
 ASJA 2010 Writing Award in the Lifestyle Narratives category
 Society of Magazine Designers Gold Medals in October 2010 and November 2010
 The Endocrine Society Award for Excellence in Science and Medical Journalism & American Academy of Orthopaedic Surgeons’ Orthopaedic Reporting Excellence

References

External links
 Official magazine website 
 More at Meredith.com
 More Magazine Canada website

Defunct women's magazines published in the United States
Magazines established in 1997
Magazines disestablished in 2016
Magazines published in Iowa
Mass media in Des Moines, Iowa
Defunct Meredith Corporation magazines
Women's fashion magazines
Ten times annually magazines